Veslesmeden is a mountain in Dovre Municipality in Innlandet county, Norway. The mountain is surrounded by several other notable mountains including Digerronden and Høgronden to the northeast, Rondeslottet to the east, Storsmeden to the south, Sagtindan and Trolltinden to the west; Gråhøe and Vassberget to the northwest; and Stygghøin to the north.

The mountain is easily hiked from the cabin Rondvassbu (DNT). Experienced mountain hikers may scramble to Storsmeden from Veslesmeden.

Name
The meaning of the name is "the little blacksmith".

See also
List of mountains of Norway

References

Dovre
Mountains of Innlandet